Stringtown may refer to:
Stringtown, Clarke County, Virginia
Stringtown, Scott County, Virginia
Stringtown, Wythe County, Virginia
Stringtown, West Virginia (disambiguation)